Fagersanna is a locality situated in Tibro Municipality, Västra Götaland County, Sweden with 539 inhabitants in 2010.

References 

Populated places in Västra Götaland County
Populated places in Tibro Municipality